Kalle Vilpuu (born 24 July 1963, Estonia) is an Estonian guitarist and songwriter.
Vilpuu is best known as the guitarist for Estonian rock band Ultima Thule. He also has played guitar for Estonian bands House Of Games and Seitsmes Meel.
In 2013, Vilpuu released his debut solo album Silver Lining.
This album consists of 11 instrumental tracks, including the core rhythm section of Andrus Lillepea (drums) and Henno Kelp (bass). Hard rock, jazz-rock and a spacier type of 21st century progressive/soundtrack music merges on Kalle Vilpuu's Silver Lining. In 2015, Dutch radio station T-on-Air selected Silver Lining as album of the year.

Discography

Silver Lining (2013, CD) Guitar Laborotory

References

Videos

External links 
 
 
 
 Kalle Vilpuu – Silver Lining review by Pedro Bekkers
 Magazine Muusika (in Estonian)

1963 births
Estonian rock guitarists
Living people
20th-century Estonian musicians
21st-century Estonian musicians